Statistics of Latvian Higher League in the 1959 season.

Overview
It was contested by 10 teams, and RER won the championship.

League standings

Playoff tournament

Championship match
RER 3-2 Sarkanais Metalurgs

References
RSSSF

Latvian SSR Higher League
Football 
Latvia